Kaboom was the name of a vitamin-fortified, circus-themed breakfast cereal produced by General Mills, which contained  oat cereal bits shaped like smiling clown faces and marshmallow bears, lions, elephants, and stars. Its mascot was a smiling circus clown. It originated in 1969.

Known primarily as a breakfast cereal of the 1970s and 1980s, Kaboom remained available for sale until 2010 when it was discontinued by General Mills.

Appearances
 Kaboom cereal was referenced in the first chapter of Don DeLillo's 1985 novel White Noise.
 Quentin Tarantino's 2003 movie Kill Bill: Volume 1 included a scene in which character Vernita Green uses a gun hidden in a box of Kaboom cereal in an attempt to kill The Bride. 
 A box of Kaboom also appears as a focal point in the Butthole Surfers' video for their song "Cherub".
 Kaboom cereal was referenced in the "Game of Tones" episode of Futurama.
 Kaboom was the subject of a humorous essay at Ace of Spades HQ on September 4, 2013.
 In the Mary Tyler Moore episode "Just Friends", anchorman Ted Baxter lists Kaboom and Cocoa Puffs as his favorite cereals.
 Kaboom cereal was referenced in the MST3k episode "Indestructable Man" during the opening dialogue.

See also
 List of defunct consumer brands

References

Products introduced in 1969
General Mills cereals
discontinued products
Products and services discontinued in 2010
Historical foods in American cuisine